Runar Karlsson (born 3 June 1953) is a politician in the Åland Islands, an autonomous and unilingually Swedish territory of Finland.

On Åland he is well known for his proposals for more roundabouts, hence his nickname "Roundabout-Runar".

Government posts
Minister of Communications 2005-2009
Member of the Lagting (Åland parliament) 2003-
Minister of Transportation and Energy 1999-2003

References

External links
 Official site

1953 births
Living people
Politicians from Åland
Government ministers of Åland